The Benton News is an American weekly newspaper published in Benton, Illinois.

In addition to Benton, the Evening News covers Christopher, Sesser and Thompsonville, and Franklin County.

References

External links 
 
 GateHouse Media

Newspapers published in Illinois
Companies based in Franklin County, Illinois
Newspapers established in 1922
1922 establishments in Illinois